Kim Su-an (born 10 June 1993) is a South Korean footballer who plays as striker or centre-back for Seoul E-Land FC.

Career
Kim joined K League 1 side Ulsan Hyundai before 2014 season starts.

References

1993 births
Living people
Association football forwards
South Korean footballers
Ulsan Hyundai FC players
Ulsan Hyundai Mipo Dockyard FC players
Gangwon FC players
Chungju Hummel FC players
Seoul E-Land FC players
Pocheon Citizen FC players
K League 1 players
Korea National League players
K League 2 players
K4 League players